Transcription factor II E (TFIIE) is one of several general transcription factors that make up the RNA polymerase II preinitiation complex. It is a tetramer of two alpha and two beta chains and interacts with TAF6/TAFII80, ATF7IP, and varicella-zoster virus IE63 protein.

TFIIE recruits TFIIH to the initiation complex and stimulates the RNA polymerase II C-terminal domain kinase and DNA-dependent ATPase activities of TFIIH. Both TFIIH and TFIIE are required for promoter clearance by RNA polymerase. Transcription factor II E is encoded by the GTF2E1 and GTF2E2 genes.  TFIIE is thought to be involved in DNA melting at the promoter: it contains a zinc ribbon motif that can bind single stranded DNA.

See also 
 TFIIH
 TFIIB
 TFIID

References

External links
 

Molecular genetics
Proteins
Gene expression
Transcription factors